Nate Milne is the head football coach at Muhlenberg College in Allentown, Pennsylvania, a position he has held since the 2018 season. Milne won the AFCA Coach of the Year Award for NCAA Division III in 2019.

Milne graduated from Jamestown High School in Jamestown, New York in 1999 and then attended Hobart and William Smith Colleges in Geneva, New York, where played college football for the Hobart Statesmen.

Head coaching record

References

External links
 Muhlenberg profile

Year of birth missing (living people)
Living people
Cortland Red Dragons football coaches
Hobart Statesmen football players
Muhlenberg Mules football coaches
Susquehanna River Hawks football coaches
People from Jamestown, New York
Coaches of American football from New York (state)
Players of American football from New York (state)